John Carrington may refer to:
 John Carrington (judge) (1847–1913), British jurist, Solicitor General of Barbados, Chief Justice of St Lucia and Tobago, Attorney General of British Guiana and Chief Justice of Hong Kong 
 John F. Carrington (1914–1985), English missionary and expert on drum language
 John H. Carrington (1934–2017), Republican member of the North Carolina General Assembly
 John P. Carrington (1941–2022), Journalist and financier